"Mighty" Tebor Brosch Jr. (born October 9, 1982 in Toronto, Ontario) is a Canadian professional boxer. He is the reigning Canadian Professional Boxing Council (CPBC) welterweight champion, holding a record of 7-4-5, with 2 wins by KO/TKO.

Career History
Brosch’s first experience in combat sports was kickboxing, in which he trained extensively during his teenage years.  At the age of 20, Tebor began to train exclusively in boxing. He debuted as an amateur in September 2003 at the Summer Hayes Tournament in Brantford, Ontario, winning gold as a middleweight. In October 2004, Brosch repeated his performance by again earning the Hayes tournament gold medal.

At the age of 23, Brosch made the decision to turn professional. He made his pro debut  against Codey Hanna in Winnipeg, Manitoba on  January 26, 2007; Brosch dropped a unanimous decision to the 3-0 Hanna. The pair would later fight twice more, which resulted in draws for both bouts.

Tebor fought four times in 2008 at 155 lbs, drawing twice and dropping two decisions.  He competed in another four matches the following year, winning 3 fights (2 by stoppage) and drawing once at 145 lbs.

Professional Titles
On July 13, 2010, Brosch fought his first championship match for the vacant CPBC welterweight title. His opponent, Justin “the Matrix” Fountain, had previously fought him to a draw two years prior.

The bloody back and forth match lasted for 7 rounds, with the combatants trading heavy shots and receiving cuts over both eyes. After the 7th  round, the ringside doctor assessed the damage absorbed by Fountain’s right eye and recommended that the contest be stopped before the 8th. Because some of the damage was delivered via an accidental clash of heads, the  judges went to their scorecards to render a decision.

Brosch was awarded the split decision victory, and became the CPBC welterweight champion. His first title defense took place February 19, 2011 against undefeated challenger Samuel Vargas at the Hershey Centre. The back and forth match resulted in a draw. On October 24, 2012, Brosch was knocked out in just 127 seconds by Ukrainian prospect Ivan Redkach.

Professional Record

References

External links
Personal Website
Tebor Brosch Interview By theboxingexaminer.com

1982 births
Living people
Boxers from Toronto
Canadian male boxers
Canadian people of Ukrainian descent